Adrien René Franchet (21 April 1834 in Pezou – 15 February 1900 in Paris) was a French botanist, based at the Paris Muséum national d'Histoire naturelle.

He is noted for his extensive work describing the flora of China and Japan, based on the collections made by French Catholic missionaries in China, Armand David, Pierre Jean Marie Delavay, Paul Guillaume Farges, Jean-André Soulié, and others.

He was the taxonomic author of many plants, including a significant number of species from the genera Primula and Rhododendron. The following genera are named in his honor:
 Franchetella, family Sapotaceae, named by Jean Baptiste Louis Pierre.
 Franchetia, family Rubiaceae, named by Henri Ernest Baillon.
Sinofranchetia, family Lardizabalaceae, named by William Botting Hemsley.

Selected writings 
 Essai sur la distribution géographique des plantes phanérogames dans le département de Loir-et-Cher, 1868 - Essay on the geographical distribution of phanerogams found in the department of Loir-et-Cher.
 "Enumeratio plantarum in Japonia : sponte crescentium hucusque rite cognitarum", 1875–1879. Together with Ludovic Savatier.
 Plantae Delavayanae. Plantes de Chine recueillies au Yun-nan par l'abbé Delavay, 1889 - "Plantae Delavayanae" : Plants from China collected in Yunnan by Father Delavay.
 Contributions à la flore du Congo français, Famille des graminées, 1896 - Contributions involving flora of the French Congo; Family Gramineae.

See also
 European and American voyages of scientific exploration

References

External links 
 
 

19th-century French botanists
1834 births
1900 deaths
Botanists active in China
Botanists active in Japan
Botanists with author abbreviations
People from Loir-et-Cher
Pteridologists